Smoothing is the reduction or elimination in the roughness or unevenness of a surface or other thing.

Smoothing may refer to:
 Smoothing, a type of statistical technique for handling data
 Smoothing (phonetics)
 Image smoothing
 Relaxation (iterative method), iterative smoothing of solutions and errors in computational science
 The Smoothing problem in stochastic processes. See Smoothing problem (stochastic processes)

See also
 Smooth (disambiguation)
 Polishing